Vernon Chatman (born October 31, 1972) is an American television producer, writer, voice actor, stand-up comedian, musician and a member of PFFR, an art collective based in Brooklyn, New York City. He created the television series Wonder Showzen, Xavier: Renegade Angel, The Heart, She Holler and The Shivering Truth. He also produces and voices characters for South Park.

Early life
Chatman was born in Brooklyn, New York. He is of mixed race, half Euro-American and half African-American. Chatman attended San Francisco State University, from which he graduated in 1994.

Career
In 1996 Chatman began his career as a stand-up comedian and eventually a comedy writer, producer, musician, and television creator. Chatman previously wrote for television shows such as The Chris Rock Show (for which he won an Emmy), Late Night with Conan O'Brien, That's My Bush! and The Downer Channel. Before Wonder Showzen, he and long-time friend and PFFR collaborator John Lee  created the Snoop Dogg comedy series Doggy Fizzle Televizzle for MTV.

Along with Lee, he is the co-creator of the MTV2 series Wonder Showzen as well as the Adult Swim shows Xavier: Renegade Angel and The Heart, She Holler. The two met as undergraduates at San Francisco State University. One of his most high-profile voice acting roles is as Towelie, the marijuana-smoking talking towel on South Park, where he also serves as a staff writer. In 2012, he became a producer on the third season of the FX series Louie. In 2017, Adult Swim ordered The Shivering Truth, a "darkly surreal anthology comedy" from Chatman. In January 13 2022, it was announced that he will write an untitled comedy film with involvement from Kendrick Lamar, Dave Free, Trey Parker and Matt Stone.

Voices on South Park

Towelie (2001–2010, 2018–present)
Tiger Woods
C.D.C. Man #5
Dominic Cobb
Matt Hasselbeck

Discography

Rock Rocker Rocketh (2001, self-released)
United We Doth (2003, Birdman)
Dark Louds Over Red Meat (2018, Housewife Records)

Filmography

Television

Film

Video games

Books
The External World, co-written with David O'Reilly (2010)
The Original Black Swan, collaboration with Todd Barry (2011)
Mindsploitation: Asinine Assignments for the Online Homework Cheating Industry (April 23, 2013)

Awards and nominations

Emmy Awards
Chatman has been nominated for seven Emmy Awards, winning four.

 2013 – Primetime Emmy Award for Outstanding Animated Program (for Programming Less Than One Hour) for "Raising the Bar"
 2009 – Primetime Emmy Award for Outstanding Animated Program (for Programming Less Than One Hour) for "Margaritaville"
 2008 – Primetime Emmy Award for Outstanding Animated Program (for Programming One Hour or More) for "Imaginationland"
 1999 – Outstanding Writing for a Variety or Music Program for "The Chris Rock Show"

Nominations
 2011 – Outstanding Animated Program for "Crack Baby Athletic Association
 2010 – Outstanding Animated Program for "200/201"
 2000 – Outstanding Writing for a Variety, Music or Comedy Program for "The Chris Rock Show"

Writers Guild of America Awards
Chatman has won two WGA Awards.
 2013 – Comedy Series - Series for "Louie"
 2000 – Comedy/Variety (Including Talk) - Series for "Late Night with Conan O'Brien"

References

External links

1972 births
American male writers
American male screenwriters
Television producers from New York City
American male voice actors
San Francisco State University alumni
Primetime Emmy Award winners
Living people
Writers Guild of America Award winners
Musicians from Brooklyn
PFFR
American skeptics
African-American musicians
African-American screenwriters
African-American male comedians
American male comedians
21st-century American comedians
American comedy musicians
American music video directors
American stand-up comedians
African-American male actors
American television directors
American television writers
Year of birth uncertain
American male television actors
American male television writers
Film directors from New York (state)
Screenwriters from New York (state)